Minderhout is a village in the Belgian municipality of Hoogstraten in the province of Antwerp close to the border with the Netherlands. As of 2021, it has about 4,420 inhabitants.

History 
The village was first mentioned in 1238 as Minrehout, and means "the smaller forest". Minderhout was founded from Baarle .The Thorn Abbey used to have many possession in Minderhout, and the village and neighbouring Castelré originally belonged to the Land of Breda. During the 14th century, Minderhout became the property of the Lords of Hoogstraten, but Castelré remained with Breda, therefore, the original area was cut in two. In 1794, it became an independent municipality. Minderhout would remain independent until 1977 when it was merged into Hoogstraten.

Gallery

References

External links 
 
  Official website of Hoogstraten

Sub-municipalities of Hoogstraten
Former municipalities of Antwerp Province
Belgium–Netherlands border crossings
Populated places in Antwerp Province